Francesc Xavier Gil Sánchez (born 24 May 1982), commonly known as Xavier Gil, is an Andorran footballer, who currently plays for FC Santa Coloma and Andorra national team.

International career
Gil made his debut on 21 August 2002, coming on as a substitute for Justo Ruiz in a 3–0 friendly match defeat against Iceland. He has been capped three times.

National team statistics

References

1982 births
Living people
Andorran footballers
FC Andorra players
FC Santa Coloma players
Association football defenders
Andorra international footballers